Mighty Morphin Power Rangers is a video game for the Sega CD console. It was produced by Sega TruVideo and released by Sega in US and Europe in 1994. The game consists mostly of footage from nine episodes of the Mighty Morphin Power Rangers TV series, which featured footage from Kyōryū Sentai Zyuranger.

Gameplay
Gameplay requires the player to press certain buttons at precise moments throughout the game as they appear on screen. If the player misses, the health meter will drop. However, there are points in the game where the player can press a button unprompted for extra points. At the end of each level, the player's progress is tallied. The points earned will be used to refill the player's health meter and can even score an extra life. Footage from episodes of the television series was used for the game. This footage was heavily cut down for disc space and level length. As a result, the five-part "Green With Evil" serial was turned into four small segments for the game.

The game has a total of ten levels. Levels six and seven are playable only on normal and hard modes, and levels eight, nine, and ten are playable only on hard mode.

Reception
In the United States, it was the top-selling Sega CD game in December 1994.

In their review, GamePro remarked that the use of actual Power Rangers footage would make it appeal to fans of the show, but that the quick time event gameplay is overly simplistic and forces the player to choose between enjoying the footage and keeping an eye on the on-screen directions which they must follow to keep advancing. The four reviewers of Electronic Gaming Monthly gave it a unanimous score of 4 out of 10, panning the game for its poor video quality and limited interactivity.

References

1994 video games
Sega CD games
Sega CD-only games
Power Rangers video games
Interactive movie video games
Full motion video based games
Video games developed in the United States
Video games set in California